Little My (original , literally: "Little Mu") is a character in the Moomin series of books by Tove Jansson. The character first appeared in the fourth book, The Exploits of Moominpappa (1950). She is a small, determined and fiercely independent Mymble. Little My is brash, aggressive, mischievous and disrespectful, but can also be a good friend when she wants to. She is the Mymble's daughter's younger sister. She was eventually adopted by the Moomin family.

The name originated from the twelfth letter of the Greek alphabet: μ (mu) – transliterated as my and pronounced  in Swedish. In the metric system, lowercase μ, meaning "one-millionth", represents the prefix micro-, from the Greek , meaning "small".

Personality
Little My is a very abrasive person who almost always succeeds in persuading her listener or discussion partner. She is an unconventional debater who uses emotion and logic to win arguments. She typically makes a personal attack on the person she is having the discussion with or about, states her own undocumented conclusions, exaggerates her opponents' arguments to ridicule them, and uses nonverbal effects to show her opponent's inferiority.

Appearances
Little My appears in the following books:

 The Exploits of Moominpappa (Book 4) – Little My is born on a Midsummer's Day during Moominpappa's youth, and is referred to as the smallest and youngest of all the Mymble's children; so small, in fact that you can hardly even see her. She doesn't play a very large part in the book, but does on occasion display her fondness for mischief and cheerfully morbid fascination for disaster and destruction.
Moominsummer Madness (Book 5) – In the fifth book, Little My has grown enough to take a more active part in the plot, though she is still small enough that Snufkin can carry her in his pocket. She is now in the care of her older sister, The Mymble's daughter, who tries unsuccessfully to teach her good behavior, but is separated from the others during the course of the plot and ends up being rescued by Snufkin, whom she accompanies for most of the rest of the book as he battles a rule-obsessed Park Keeper and ends up unwittingly "rescuing" a group of other children as well.
Moominland Midwinter (Book 6) – Little My is the only character, apart from Moomintroll, who wakes from hibernation and gets to experience winter for the first time. Unlike him, she immediately finds this "new, ice-cold world" to be great fun, especially after she discovers winter sports.
Tales from Moominvalley (Book 7) – This book consists of several short stories, three of which feature Little My: "A Tale of Horror", in which she tells tall tales of terror and doom to the Next-to-youngest-Whomper; "The Last Dragon on Earth", in which she basically plays the nosy, sarcastic, and insensitive younger sibling to Moomintroll (though actually being older than him); and "The Invisible Child", in which she demonstrates her own ideas about how to help the invisible Ninny become visible again.
Moominpappa at Sea (Book 8) – Little My accompanies the Moomin family to the lighthouse island and is a constant presence in the book. Again, she is the only character who instantly takes to the new life and remains cheerful throughout.

In addition, Little My plays major roles in the picture-books The Book about Moomin, Mymble and Little My and An Unwanted Guest, has a brief speaking role in The Dangerous Journey, and makes a silent (and unmentioned by the narrative) cameo in one of the illustrations in Who Will Comfort Toffle?. She is also mentioned a number of times in Moominvalley in November, but since this book takes place roughly at the same time as the trip to the lighthouse island in Moominpappa at Sea, she doesn't actually appear in person.

She also shows up as a major character in most Moomin-related media, comics, movies, and TV series.

References

Works cited
 
 

Literary characters introduced in 1950
Moomin characters
Child characters in anime and manga
Child characters in comics
Child characters in literature
Child characters in television
Child characters in film
Female characters in animation
Female characters in comics
Female characters in literature
Female characters in film